The Mercato eruption (Pomici di Mercato) of Mount Vesuvius was a Plinian eruption that occurred around 8,010 ± 40 14C yr BP (8,890 ± 90 cal yr BP).
The Global Volcanism Program claims that the eruption had a Volcanic Explosivity Index (VEI) of 5, while Zanella et al. (2014) estimate it had a VEI of 6. The eruption was preceded by 7000 years of rest and followed by about 4000 years of rest.

See also
List of large volcanic eruptions

References

External links
 Stratigraphy and eruptive dynamics of a pulsating Plinian eruption of Somma-Vesuvius: the Pomici di Mercato

Mount Vesuvius
Prehistoric volcanic events
Volcanic eruptions in Italy
Prehistoric Italy
VEI-5 eruptions
VEI-6 eruptions
7th millennium BC
Plinian eruptions